In a New Setting is an album by vibraphonist Milt Jackson featuring McCoy Tyner recorded in 1964 and released on the Limelight label.

Reception
The Allmusic review by Ken Dryden awarded the album 4 stars stating "The leader's percussive but swinging style, plus the potent solos by Tyner and Heath, are all appealing".

Track listing
All compositions by Milt Jackson except as indicated
 "Sonny's Blues" - 3:38 
 "I'm Gonna Laugh You Right Out of My Life" (Cy Coleman, Joseph McCarthy) - 3:33 
 "Spanish Fly" (McCoy Tyner) - 3:17 
 "No Moon at All" (Redd Evans, David Mann) - 3:25 
 "Slow Death" - 4:51 
 "Clay's Blues" - 2:48 
 "Lazy Melody" - 2:46 
 "Project S" (Jimmy Heath) - 4:12 
 "Ev'ry Time We Say Goodbye" (Cole Porter) - 2:41 
 "That's In" - 3:00 
 "Ineffable" (Heath) - 2:33 
 "The Other Half of Me" (Stan Freeman, Jack Lawrence) - 3:07 Bonus track on CD reissue  
Recorded in New York City on December 9, 1964 (tracks 9 & 12), December 14, 1964 (tracks 6, 7 & 10) and December 28, 1964 (tracks 1-5, 8 & 11)

Personnel
Milt Jackson – vibes
Jimmy Heath - flute, tenor saxophone
McCoy Tyner - piano
Bob Cranshaw - bass
Connie Kay - drums

References 

Limelight Records albums
Milt Jackson albums
1965 albums